Iglu & Hartly is an American pop rock band from Los Angeles, California. The band is composed of Jarvis Anderson (vocals, keyboards), Sam Martin (vocals, keyboards), Simon Katz (guitar), Luis Rosiles (drums), and Michael Bucher (bass).

History

Formation 
Jarvis Anderson, Sam Martin, and Simon Katz met at the University of Colorado at Boulder. Before long, the 3 of them left school and moved to Echo Park, California to pursue a career in music. Shortly after moving to Los Angeles, Luis Rosiles flew from Jarvis' hometown of Park Ridge, Illinois to join the band as their drummer, and LA local Michael Bucher joined as bassist.

Signing to Mercury Records (2008) 
After two years of playing in Southern California clubs, the band started receiving strong interest from a number of major record labels in the United Kingdom, as well as getting airplay from Jim Gellatly on Xfm Scotland there. The band finally decided to sign with Mercury Records, but not before releasing their debut UK single "Violent & Young" on indie label Another Music = Another Kitchen on June 2, 2008 to critical acclaim.

The band's next single "In This City" was released in September 2008 and was identified as "an anthem in the making" by an NME blogger. This kicked a massive tour, seeing the band play over 120 shows in a span of 150 days in 17 countries. "In This City" became a success across Europe, peaking within the top ten of the charts in Belgium (Flanders), the Republic of Ireland, and the United Kingdom. In the latter country, Iglu & Hartley performed "In This City" on the BBC One chat show Friday Night with Jonathan Ross, helping the song peak at number five on the UK Singles Chart, securing the band their first and only top ten hit in Britain. An instrumental version of the song was also used as the theme tune for the "Goal of the Month" competitions on the BBC One sports show Match of the Day. 
British music magazine NME featured the Band in over 15 different pieces prior to and after their controversial review of the album, including inviting the band to headline two dates on their NME Awards Tour. They also named them one of the "Twenty Bands Making America Cool Again." In regards to other press outlets the album and the band were a polarizing force, generating both glowing reviews and venomous criticism.

Live performances
The band has gained quite a reputation for their live shows, playing both small venues and large festivals with equal intensity, passion and fervor.  In a review of a show in St Louis on August 26, 2009, one newspaper wrote, "In their ripped jeans and tank tops, Iglu and Hartly took the stage at the Firebird around 9:45 p.m., the people there witnessed a phenomenal show."  SPIN included them in their "Best of Bumbershoot Festival 2009" and called their performance "absurdly successful"  The band played at The UCD Ball in Dublin in both 2009 and 2010.

Debut in the United States (2009) 
On May 5, 2009 their CD "& Then Boom" was released in the United States. They performed on Last Call with Carson Daly as part of their promotional tour.
At SXSW in Austin, Iglu & Hartly's Jarvis Anderson  was arrested in the early hours of March 19 after allegedly assaulting a hotel security guard while half naked.

Iglu & Hartly performed their song "DayGlo" live at BETA Records TV Studios in Hollywood, California. The acoustic song segment was taken in October 2009 for the BETA Records Music TV Series, directed by Eric MacIver and produced by Chris Honetschlaeger.

Hiatus and New Projects (2011) 
It was announced  by various members through their respective Twitter and Facebook pages that Iglu & Hartly is on "hiatus" with no plans for a second record.  Jarvis has announced through his Twitter page that he is going "solo" and will have a record out very soon.  Sam and Simon, the other founding members of the band, have started a new project called Youngblood Hawke that has released an EP and is already getting radio play in the UK.  Youngblood Hawke signed with Universal Republic in early 2012 and are releasing a new EP in August 2012.

Reunion: Hermosa Beach Summer Series (2019) 
On July 15, 2019, the band announced a one-time reunion at Hermosa Beach Summer Series via their Facebook page. The Hermosa Beach, CA festival is scheduled to take place August 17–18, 2019, presented by KROQ.

In December 2020, the band returned with a new song, ‘Cooler’, while in 2021 Sam Martin released a solo single called ‘Patience’ under the name Sunshine Boysclub.

Band members 
Current members
Jarvis Anderson – vocals, keyboards (2006-2011)
Sam Martin – vocals, keyboards (2006–2011)
Simon Katz – guitar (2006–2011)
Michael Bucher – bass (2008–2011)
Luis Rosiles – drums (2006–2011)
Former members
Dave Bantz – vocals (2006–2007)

Extra
 "Violent and Young" is featured in the video game Colin McRae: Dirt 2.
 "In This City" is featured in the basketball game NBA 2K10, as well as its limited edition commemorating the tenth anniversary of the NBA 2K series.
 "In This City" was also featured on the Freakonomics Radio podcast on May 12, 2010, as economist Steven Levitt's favorite song.

Discography

Studio albums

Singles 
"Violent and Young" (2008)
"In This City" (2008) - UK #5, Ireland #9, Europe #33, US Billboard Modern Rock #35, BPI: Silver
"Dedication" (2009)

References

External links 
 igluandhartly.com, Official Site (offline)
 Review of 'Violent And Young' at Daily Music Guide
 Myspace.com/igluandhartley, Official MySpace Page

Musical groups from Los Angeles